The Puntland Electoral Commission (PEC) is a governmental body in the autonomous Puntland region in northeastern Somalia. Since 2012, it has been guiding the region's gradual shift from a parliament-based vote system to multi-party elections.

References

Election commissions
Elections in Somalia
Politics of Somalia
Political organisations based in Somalia